Sikgaek may refer to:

Sikgaek (manhwa), 2002 South Korean serialized manhwa (comic)
Le Grand Chef, 2007 film adaptation
Gourmet (TV series), 2008 TV adaptation

See also
Le Grand Chef 2: Kimchi Battle, 2010 film